This is a list of 312 species in the genus Photinus.

Photinus species

References